Glycoprotein hormone alpha-2 is a protein that in humans is encoded by the GPHA2 gene.

GPHA2 is a cystine knot-forming polypeptide and a subunit of the dimeric glycoprotein hormone family (Hsu et al., 2002).[supplied by OMIM]

References

7.	Z. Gong, W. Wang, K. El Omari, A. A. Lebedev, O. B. Clarke, W. A. Hendrickson, Crystal structure of LGR ligand alpha2/beta5 from Caenorhabditis elegans with implications for the evolution of glycoprotein hormones. Proc Natl Acad Sci U S A 120 (1), e2218630120 (2023). https://www.pnas.org/doi/10.1073/pnas.2218630120#

Further reading